Brian Peterson may refer to:

 Brian Peterson (soccer) (1936–2020), South African former footballer
 Brian Wayne Peterson (born 1971/2), American screenwriter and television producer
 Brian C. Peterson, American convicted of manslaughter in 1998

See also
 Bryan Petersen (born 1986), baseball player